Nectandra herrerae is a species of plant in the family Lauraceae. It is endemic to Peru.  It is threatened by habitat loss.

References

herrerae
Endangered flora of South America
Trees of Peru
Endemic flora of Peru